Law Junction railway station served the village of Law, South Lanarkshire, Scotland from 1879 to 1965 on the Caledonian main line.

History 
The station opened on 1 December 1879 by the Caledonian Railway. To the southwest was Shawfield Colliery, which the station was used as a junction for before it opened. There were two signal boxes: one to the north that opened in 1880 and Law Junction South signal box that opened with the station. It later closed in 1897. To the northeast was a goods yard which had a shed and a loading bank, with sidings to the west. In between this and the running line were dead end sidings, with further sidings to the south as well as an eight carriage shed. Shawfield Colliery closed before the Second World War. The station closed on 4 January 1965.

References

External links 

Disused railway stations in South Lanarkshire
Former Caledonian Railway stations
Railway stations in Great Britain opened in 1879
Railway stations in Great Britain closed in 1965
1879 establishments in Scotland
1965 disestablishments in Scotland
Beeching closures in Scotland